Timo Stavitski (born 17 July 1999) is a Finnish professional footballer who plays as a forward for Veikkausliiga club Inter Turku.

Club career

Early career
Stavitski joined Veikkausliiga side RoPS in early 2017. He scored his first professional goal in a 2–6 defeat by Inter Turku.

In December 2017, after trialling with Barcelona, Stavitski joined French Ligue 1 side Caen.

Caen
After six months on loan for NK Osijek, in January 2019, he went again on loan for RoPS.

On 4 February 2019, Stavitski was loaned out to RoPS, where he played before in 2017, until mid July. Stavitski had had a long-lasting pain in his groin for about six to seven months. It resulted in a surgery in April 2019 and he would be out for the rest of the season. Stavitski returned to France to get treatment in Caen.

In July 2020, Stavitski joined Dutch Eerste Divisie club MVV Maastricht on a one-season loan.

On 7 January 2022, his contract with Caen was terminated by mutual consent.

Personal life
Stavitski is of Ingrian Finnish descent, and he is bilingual, speaking both Finnish and Russian.

Career statistics

1Includes Finnish Cup and Coupe de France appearances.
2Includes Finnish League Cup and Coupe de la Ligue appearances.

References

External links
 

1999 births
Living people
People from Kirkkonummi
Finnish footballers
Finnish expatriate footballers
Finland youth international footballers
Finland under-21 international footballers
Association football forwards
Kyrkslätt Idrottsförening players
Helsingin Jalkapalloklubi players
Rovaniemen Palloseura players
Stade Malherbe Caen players
NK Osijek players
MVV Maastricht players
Kakkonen players
Ligue 1 players
Championnat National 3 players
Veikkausliiga players
Eerste Divisie players
Expatriate footballers in France
Finnish expatriate sportspeople in France
Expatriate footballers in the Netherlands
Finnish expatriate sportspeople in the Netherlands
People of Ingrian Finnish descent
Russian-speaking Finns
Sportspeople from Uusimaa